Kalabsh 2 (Handcuff) is a 2018 Egyptian TV-Series, a sequel to Kalabsh, which was aired on the previous Ramadan season. It was directed by Peter Mimy and written by Baher Dewidar. It was one of the most recognized shows during Ramadan season.

A third season was announced to be aired in Ramadan 2019.

Production

Director Peter Mimy previously announced the title of the season would be Pasha Masr" (a title was repeatedly given to Slim Al Ansari by deputy officer Zenaty, it means: Pasha of Egypt, but then they stuck with original Kalabsh. Maya Zaki (Daughter of actress Rojina) worked in the film as in costumes department.
The season introduced Haitham Zaki (Son of Ahmed Zaki) as Aref Abu El Ez and Rojina as Leyla El Shimi.

Overview
The season revolves more around the patriot personality of officer Slim El Ansari (Amir Karara), and on subjects like Islamic radical groups such as ISIS, Al-Nusra, along with criticism against their ideology. The 30-episode series was officially well-received by Egyptian police force.

Cast

 Amir Karara: Sleim El Ansari
 Mohamed Lotfy: Ibrahim El-Sunni
 Haitham Zaki: Akef Abu El Ez El Jabalawy
 Abdel Rahman Abou Zahra : Abu El Ez El Jabalawy
 Reem Mostafa: Farida (Slim's wife)
 Ahmed Seyam: Lutfi Abu El-Majd
 Mohsen Mansour: Mahmoud Abd El-Moneim (Houda Saitara)
Mohamed Mahmoud Abd Al-Aziz: Saeed Al Morsi
 Mahmoud El Bezawy: Salah El-Tokhi
 Mahmoud Hegazy: Ziad
 Mohamed Marzaban: Hammad (Parliament member)
 Sara Elshamy: Salma El Ansari (Slim's sister)
 Hala Fakher: Nadia El Ansari (Slim's mother)
 Rojina: Leyla El Shimi
Soliman Eid: Shaker
Ahmed Salah Hosny: Adham (Ex-cop and pro assassin)

Episodes

References 

Egyptian television series
Arabic television series
Egyptian drama television series
Capital Broadcasting Center original programming